Muntowo  is a village in the administrative district of Gmina Mrągowo, within Mrągowo County, Warmian-Masurian Voivodeship, in northern Poland.

Notable residents
 Paul Ogorzow (1912–1941), Berlin's S-Bahn murderer

References

Muntowo